Poverty Campaign: Speak Up is a society show on Hong Kong's TVB sponsored by general manager Stephen Chan.  The title literally means "The story of a million people" as the show allows the poor to speak out about their poverty experience.  Most complaints are against the way the Hong Kong government and major corporations treat them unfairly.  Much of the theme is about the increasing gap between the rich and the poor.

Episodes
 Poverty Campaign: Speak Up: Donation operations
 Poverty Campaign: Speak Up: Learn and care
 Poverty Campaign: Speak Up: Citizens open talk

Government problems
 Lack of minimum wages 
 Uneven and unfair distribution of government wealth
 The government only listens to the rich, then make laws that favor the rich
 No actions are taken to help the poor
 Some comparisons are made for government standard before and after the 1997 handover

Society problems
 Lowered living standards, instead of increasing
 Large families often supported by 1 working member in the household
 Growing numbers of children born below the poverty line

Participants
An example of a participant of the show is Ah Ying.  She was a toilet cleaner employed by contractors hired by the Food and Environmental Hygiene Department.  Her hourly wage cut from HK$23.50 to HK$20, when her job title was changed to "washroom attendant" in 2005.

Celebrities who have taken part
 Eason Chan
 Kelly Chan
 Eric Tsang
 Carina Lau
 Sandra Ng
 Stephen Chan

Notes

References
 TVB 捐贈大行動
 TVB April 4, 2008

TVB original programming